The Journal of Women's Health is a monthly peer-reviewed healthcare journal focusing on women's health care, including advancements in diagnostic procedures, therapeutic protocols for the management of diseases, and research in gender-based biology that impacts patient care and treatment. The journal was established in 1992 and is published by Mary Ann Liebert, Inc. The editor-in-chief is Susan G. Kornstein (Virginia Commonwealth University). It is the official journal of the Academy of Women's Health and the American Medical Women's Association.

Abstracting and indexing 
The journal is abstracted and indexed in:

According to Journal Citation Reports, the journal has a 201 impact factor of 2.322, ranking it 3rd out of 41 journals in the category "Women's Studies".

See also 
 List of women's studies journals

References

External links 
 
 Academy of Women's Health

English-language journals
Mary Ann Liebert academic journals
Monthly journals
Publications established in 1992
Obstetrics and gynaecology journals
Healthcare journals
Academic journals associated with learned and professional societies